Montmorency is the protagonist of the Montmorency series of Victorian-era thrillers for children by Eleanor Updale, published between 2003 and 2013, in which he is a former convict turned gentleman. Montmorency works legally as a British agent and illegally as his alter ego, Montmorency's vile manservant, Scarper.

Three years prior to the main story line, Scarper was in a burglary when he fell through a glass roof. Perhaps it should have killed him, but Dr. Robert Farcett was there to save his life. After recovering and getting out of prison, Scarper raids his way across London. After meeting George Fox-Selwyn, Montmorency becomes a well-paid spy. Scarper then disappears. He has no desire to rob people again, but keeps a pair of waders "just in case".

Physical appearance

Montmorency has a number of large scars all over his body after he fell through a roof onto a grinding machine whilst being chased by the police. Before this terrible accident, his body had been athletic and strong. He has brown wavy hair and a dark complexion; he also has a young face that lies about his age.

Scarper

Scarper is the alter ego of Montmorency. He is a master of the London sewerage system and carries out thefts using the sewers as a sanctuary and escape route from the scene of crimes. The idea of using the sewers to get around London came to Montmorency when he was in the Scientific Society. Sir Joseph Bazalgette, the planner and supervisor of the London sewage system was giving a talk on what he had achieved.

Appearances

Book 1: Montmorency
Montmorency is in the Scientific Society, waiting to be exhibited for a lecture by Dr Robert Farcett, when Sir Joseph Bazalgette deliversa lecture on the new London Sewage System.

This gives him the idea of using the sewage system as a means of travelling around London unseen and carrying out robberies.

He rents a room at a run-down boarding house (which is owned by the mother of Vi Evans who later becomes one of his close friends) for his alter ego, Scarper. He also stays in a room at the Marimion hotel, for his richer self.

After saving Lord George Fox-Selwyn, they become firm friends..

Book 2: Montmorency on the Rocks
Montmorency is in trouble following an intelligence-gathering trip to Turkey. Having fallen under the influence of a Turkish drug, George Fox-Selwyn, unknown to Montmorency, is appealing to Robert Farcett to help him. Unfortunately, Dr Farcett had given up his profession in medicine after an operation went wrong.

They all travel to the Fox-Selwyn family home in the Scottish Highlands so that Montmorency can recover. On the way Montmorency accidentally reveals some embarrassing truths whilst in a drug-induced stupor.

After a while the group move to the remote Scottish island of Tarimond where Montmorency's recovery continued. But before long Farcett and Montmorency have to return to London after Fox-Selwyn asks them for assistance in finding two Irish  Separatist bombers.

Montmorency comes up with a cunning plan and, with the help of an old friend, carries it out.

Book 3: Montmorency and the Assassins
Montmorency and George Fox-Selwyn are in Italy searching for some missing natural history specimens. When they find them at a museum in Florence the Curator agrees to help them discover who stole them.

Montmorency travels to America with Dr Robert Farcett on the trail of anarchists who wreaked havoc in Florence, Italy. Both Farcett and Montmorency find more than they were bargaining for.

Book 4: Montmorency Revenge
Working with George's nephew who goes under the alias of Jack Scarper, he must discover the culprit of a terrible crime. Once more he must face the anarchists, but this time he has a much more personal reason.
.,.,.,.,

Book 5: Montmorency Returns
Montmorency returns is the final instalment in the Montmorency series. In the book, Montmorency is forced to stay in Patterson to lure in the criminal Malpensa, but he must pay a price to keep his family safe...

References
 Eleanor Updale (official) 
 Library Thing page for the first book in the series
 Library Thing page for the second book in the series
 Library Thing page for the third book in the series
 Library Thing page for the fourth book in the series
 Fantastic Fiction page for Eleanor Updale and all her works

Fictional professional thieves
Fictional impostors
Fictional British secret agents
Characters in young adult book series